Daniel Anthony Fortson (born March 27, 1976) is an American former professional basketball player. He played the power forward and center position in the National Basketball Association (NBA) from 1997 to 2007.

Early life
Although born in Philadelphia, Fortson grew up in Altoona, Pennsylvania in a difficult home environment. He did not get along well with his father, who spent some time in jail, while his mother struggled with diabetes and depression. Fortson had grown up in the same neighborhood as Doug West and began pre school at the same school West attended, Altoona Area High School.  Before starting there, he became friends with a family whose son played on his AAU basketball team. He spent two summers living with the family in the middle-class Pittsburgh suburb of Shaler Township, eighty five mile west of Altoona.

After his sophomore year, he and his mother moved to Shaler and Fortson transferred to Shaler Area High School for his final two years in high school (1992–1994). He was ruled ineligible his junior year for all but two games but averaged 30 points per game his senior year. He was a member of the prestigious Back board squad for pre-college basketball prospects.

College career
Fortson played for the Cincinnati Bearcats for 3 years from 1994 to 1997. In 1997 opposing coach Charlie Spoonhour complimented Fortson with: "I could do a chin-up on his arm, and it wouldn't affect his shooting." 

In his three years playing for the Bearcats he became the school's second highest all-time scorer by scoring 1,881 points.

A physical player with a soft shooting touch, he led UC to Conference USA championships in 1996 and 1997. He was a consensus first team All-American in 1997 when he averaged 21.3 points and 9.1 rebounds while shooting 62 percent from the field.

NBA career
Fortson began his pro career after being drafted 10th overall by the Milwaukee Bucks. He was immediately traded the same day to the Denver Nuggets. In his first year, he averaged double-digit points and the next year averaged a double-double in both points and rebounds despite being undersized playing the center position. However, he had 16.7% of his own shots blocked that season, the highest ever in the NBA as of 2012–13. Before the 1999–2000 season, he was once again traded to the Boston Celtics in a six-player deal. He missed the first 25 games of the season with a stress fracture in his right foot. He was traded to the Toronto Raptors on February 9, 2000 for Alvin Williams and Sean Marks, but the trade was rescinded two days later when Williams failed his physical.

Fortson did not play much with the Celtics and averaged 7.6 points and 6.7 rebounds per game. Following that season, he was traded to the Golden State Warriors in a four-team trade. He averaged 16.7 points and 16.3 rebounds per game for the Warriors in the first six games of the 2000–01 season, but those were the only games he would play due to another stress fracture injury in his right foot. He returned the following season, and had the best year of his career averaging 11.2 points and 11.7 rebounds in only 28.8 minutes as a starter for 76 games. In the 2002–03 season, Fortson mostly spent his time on the bench as most of his minutes went to Antawn Jamison and Troy Murphy. For the fourth time in his career, Fortson was again traded, this time in a nine-player deal to the Dallas Mavericks.

Fortson averaged only 11 minutes per game for the Mavericks, having to play behind forwards Dirk Nowitzki and Antoine Walker. Because of a need for a center who could make a jump shot, the Mavericks swapped Fortson for Calvin Booth with the Sonics in the offseason of 2004. Quickly, Fortson was back in the rotation and became a fan favorite in Seattle because of his physical play and rebounding prowess.

Fortson was a frequent target of foul calls by referees because of his physical play. As a result, Fortson registered the second-highest technical foul total among all active players during the 2004–05 season. During the 2005–06 season, Fortson's popularity and playing time diminished.

After returning from a two-game suspension on January 2, 2006, Fortson called NBA senior vice president of basketball operations Stu Jackson a "gangster" for the nearly $200,000 in fines Fortson was docked for his latest transgression with an official.

Fortson's rights were renounced by the Thunder on December 22, 2009 after not playing in the NBA since 2007.

Eighteen years after Fortson left UC, he was recognized as one of the greatest players in UC history when he was inducted into the Bearcats’ Hall of Fame on October 29, 2015. On May 21, 2016, Fortson was inducted in the Ohio Basketball Hall of Fame.

See also

Notes

References

External links

1976 births
Living people
African-American basketball players
All-American college men's basketball players
American men's basketball players
Boston Celtics players
Centers (basketball)
Cincinnati Bearcats men's basketball players
Dallas Mavericks players
Denver Nuggets players
Golden State Warriors players
McDonald's High School All-Americans
Milwaukee Bucks draft picks
Parade High School All-Americans (boys' basketball)
Power forwards (basketball)
Seattle SuperSonics players
Sportspeople from Altoona, Pennsylvania
Basketball players from Philadelphia
21st-century African-American sportspeople
20th-century African-American sportspeople